This article presents a list of the historical events and publications of Australian literature during 1952.

Books 

 Martin Boyd – The Cardboard Crown
 Jon Cleary – The Sundowners
 T. A. G. Hungerford – The Ridge and the River
 Rex Ingamells – Of Us Now Living
 Philip Lindsay
 The Merry Mistress
 The Shadow of the Red Barn
 Nevil Shute – The Far Country
 Christina Stead – The People with the Dogs
 E. V. Timms – The Challenge
 Arthur Upfield – Venom House

Short stories 

 A. Bertram Chandler – "Finishing Touch"
 Peter Cowan – "The Red-Backed Spiders"
 D'Arcy Niland – "Away to Moonlight"
 Dal Stivens – "Ironbark Bill Meets the Bunyip"
 Kylie Tennant – "The Face of Despair"

Children's and Young Adult fiction 

 Nan Chauncy – World's End was Home

Poetry 

 David Campbell
 "Dance of Flame and Shadow : Hobo Chorus"
 "Snow Gums"
 C. J. Dennis and Margaret Herron – Random Verse : A Collection of Verse and Prose
 Rosemary Dobson – "The Mirror : Jan Vermeer Speaks"
 R. D. Fitzgerald – Between Two Tides
 Max Harris – "Martin Buber in the Pub"
 James McAuley
 "Invocation"
 "Mating Swans"
 Kenneth Mackenzie
 Australian Poetry 1951-52 (edited)
 "The Snake"
 "Two Trinities"
 Ian Mudie – "They'll Tell You about Me"
 Vivian Smith – "Bedlam Hills"
 Douglas Stewart
 "Marree"
 Sun Orchids and Other Poems
 Judith Wright
 "The Ancestors"
 "Birds"
 "Our Love is So Natural"

Biography 

 Russell Braddon – The Naked Island
 Frank Hardy – Journey Into the Future
 Jack McLaren – My Civilised Adventure
 Nettie Palmer – Henry Lawson

Children's and Young Adult non-fiction 

 Eve Pownall – The Australia Book, illustrated by Margaret Senior

Awards and honours

Literary

Children's and Young Adult

Poetry

Births 

A list, ordered by date of birth (and, if the date is either unspecified or repeated, ordered alphabetically by surname) of births in 1952 of Australian literary figures, authors of written works or literature-related individuals follows, including year of death.

 9 November – Nicholas Jose, novelist

Unknown date
 Janine Burke, novelist
 Rod Moran, poet and journalist

Deaths 

A list, ordered by date of death (and, if the date is either unspecified or repeated, ordered alphabetically by surname) of deaths in 1952 of Australian literary figures, authors of written works or literature-related individuals follows, including year of birth.

 13 June – Harold Mercer, poet (born 1882)
 22 July – E. J. Brady, poet (born 1869)

See also 
 1952 in Australia
 1952 in literature
 1952 in poetry
 List of years in Australian literature
 List of years in literature

References

 
20th-century Australian literature
Australian literature by year
1952 in literature